Hed Church (Swedish: Heds kyrka) is a church in Hed socken, Sweden. It was inaugurated in 1789.

References

19th-century Church of Sweden church buildings
Churches completed in 1789
Churches in Västmanland County
Churches in the Diocese of Västerås